Twilight in the Sierras  is a 1950 American Trucolor Western film directed by William Witney and starring Roy Rogers and his horse Trigger (billed in the film's opening credits as the "Smartest Horse in the Movies"), along with Dale Evans, Estelita Rodriguez, and Pat Brady.

Plot
Ricardo Chavez is a convicted counterfeiter, who after serving time in a California prison, is released on parole to work on a ranch, as he begins his new law-abiding life. The reformed criminal, however, is soon abducted by a gang of outlaws and blackmailed to engrave printing plates to make counterfeit currency for Matt Brunner. Brunner is secretly the gang's leader, but presents himself in public as only the owner of a Morongo Valley hunting lodge. Although Ricardo now wants to pursue an honest life and forget his criminal past, Brunner threatens to harm or kill his sister Lola if he refuses to do the illegal work. Roy Rogers is Ricardo's parole officer, and with the help of Pat Callahan, a female deputy sheriff (Dale Evans), Roy uncovers the counterfeiting operation while clearing himself of a false murder charge, saves Ricardo and Lola, and defeats the gang.

Cast
 Roy Rogers as State Parole Officer Roy Rogers
 Trigger as Trigger, Roy's horse
 Dale Evans as Deputy Sheriff Pat Callahan
 Estelita Rodriguez as Lola Chavez
 Pat Brady as Dr. Sparrow Bliffle DVM
 Russ Vincent as Ricardo Chavez
 George Meeker as Matt Brunner
 Fred Kohler, Jr. as Mason, Brunner henchman
 Edward Keane as Judge Wiggins
 House Peters Jr. as Jim Williams
 Pierce Lyden as Blake, Brunner henchman
 Don Frost as bartender
 Joseph A. Garro as Brunner henchman 
 William F. Leicester as Clifford (as William Lester)
 Foy Willing as Foy
 Harry Strang as Sheriff Callahan (uncredited)

Production notes
Twilight in the Sierras was filmed in less than four weeks, between mid-September and early October 1949.
The exterior scenes for Twilight in the Sierras were filmed at the 500-acre Iverson Movie Ranch in Chatsworth, Los Angeles, located in the northwestern part of California's San Fernando Valley. 
By 1950, Estelita Rodriguez had become a familiar face to theatergoers attending Roy Rogers' films. Republic Pictures between 1945 and 1951 cast her in nine productions with the "King of the Cowboys". Twilight in the Sierras is the sixth film of those nine.
As in some of Rogers' earlier films and later on his weekly TV show, Twilight in the Sierras is thematically and stylistically an anachronistic blend of Hollywood's portrayal of the American “Wild” West of the 1870s with contemporary America of the 1940s-1950s, complete with electric lights, telephones, radios, and other modern conveniences. Horses and wagons remain the principal means of conveyance in Twilight in the Sierras, though cars, trucks, and buses are periodically in scenes; the “good guys” and “bad guys” shoot it out with classic cowboy six-shot Colt revolvers and lever-action Winchesters instead of using far more effective, up-to-date weapons, such as semiautomatic pistols and submachine guns. In its 1950 review of Twilight in the Sierras, the popular trade paper Variety noted this selective use of the old with the new, describing the film’s plot as "a curious mixture of modern gangsterism in wild west dress which the kids most likely won't mind or even notice."

Reception
Reviewers in 1950 generally found Twilight in the Sierras predictable but entertaining, especially for Republic Picture's targeted younger or "juve" (juvenile) audiences. Variety commented about such targeting as part of its own assessment of the production:
Another widely read trade paper in 1950, Motion Picture Daily, echoed Variety’s comments regarding the standardized appeal of Rogers' films. The New York-based  paper cites in its review the ingredients in Twilight in the Sierras that made it yet another successful addition to the ongoing series of films by the King of the Cowboys. "Roy Rogers", reports Motion Picture Daily, "gives his fans just about everything in this Trucolor Western complete with perfect hero, dastardly villains, much suspense, a mountain lion, and singing cowboys."

References and notes

External links
 
 
 

1950 films
1950 Western (genre) films
American Western (genre) films
Republic Pictures films
Trucolor films
Films directed by William Witney
1950s English-language films
1950s American films